Centrosomal protein of 72 kDa is a protein that in humans is encoded by the CEP72 gene.

The product of this gene is a member of the Leucine-rich repeat (LRR) superfamily of proteins. The protein is localized to the centrosome, a non-membraneous organelle that functions as the major microtubule-organizing center in animal cells.

References

Further reading

External links
 

Centrosome